Trading Team is a 1982 role-playing game adventure published by Marischal Adventures for Traveller.

Plot summary
Trading Team is an adventure that takes place in the Reavers' Deep sector between the Imperium and the Aslan Hierate.

Publication history
Trading Team was written by J. Andrew Keith and was published in 1981 by Marischal Adventures as a 4-page pamphlet; a second edition was published in 1987 by Seeker.

Reception
William A. Barton reviewed Trading Team in The Space Gamer No. 53. Barton commented that "Trading Team is another worthy addition to the Traveller line.  Unless you just don't like short folio adventures, it'll provide you with an interesting evening of Traveller role-playing."

Reviews
Different Worlds #24 (Sept., 1982)

References

Role-playing game supplements introduced in 1982
Traveller (role-playing game) adventures